La Savane is a 12½ acre park located on the Fort-de-France Bay in Martinique. It was formerly known as Jardin du Roi (garden of the king) and its first purpose is said to have been to harbor scientific experiments on plants that were new to the colony at that time.

The park has no fence. Its Caribbean gardens face Fort Saint Louis (formerly known as Fort Royal) on the east side. On the west side the park borders the Bibliothèque Schoelcher (or Schoelcher Library), a Romanesque-Byzantine building initially part of the Paris Exposition of 1889, dismantled, shipped to Martinique and re-built in Fort-de-France. La Savane is home to a statue of Josephine Tascher de La Pagerie, born on the island on 23 June 1763, later known as Josephine de Beauharnais, first wife of Napoleon and Empress of France. The Carrara marble statue, created by Vital Dubray, was vandalized and is now missing its head. The park also shelters a tiny colorful market offering exotic items, souvenirs and snacks.

References

External links
Fort-de-France – Fodor's Review (archived 11 October 2008)

Gardens in Martinique